Simblna is a village in Samba district of the union territory of Jammu and Kashmir. It is about 16 km northeast of the town of Samba.

References

Villages in Samba district